Paragomphus is a genus of dragonfly in the family Gomphidae. They are commonly known as Hooktails.

The genus contains the following species:

References

Gomphidae
Anisoptera genera
Taxonomy articles created by Polbot